Janvier is French for the month of January.

It may also refer to:

Persons
Given name
Janvier Charles Mbarga (born 1985), Cameroonian football player
 Janvier Grondin (born 1947), Quebec politician
Janvier Maharangy, Malagasy politician

Middle name
 Joseph Janvier Woodward (1833–1884), commonly known as J. J. Woodward, served in the U.S. Civil War as Army Assistant Surgeon and produced several publications on war-related diseases

Surname
 Ambroise Janvier (1613–1682), French benedictine
 Antide Janvier (1751–1835), French clockmaker
 Bernard Janvier (born 1939), French general
Caroline Janvier (born 1982), French politician
 Eric Janvier, French businessman
 Louis-Joseph Janvier (1855–1911), Haitian journalist, diplomat and novelist
 Margaret Thomson Janvier (1844–1913), American writer, sister of Thomas
 Marie-Ève Janvier, French Canadian singer
 Maxime Janvier, French tennis player
 Paul Janvier, a pseudonym used by Algis Budrys
 Philippe Janvier, French paleontologist
 Philippe Janvier (actor) (born Jacques Philippe Nugeyre, 1903–1967), French actor
 Thomas Allibone Janvier (1849–1913), American writer and historian, brother of Margaret
 Ulysse-Janvier Robillard (1826–1900), Quebec merchant and political figure

Places
Janvier 194, Indian reserve, Alberta
 Janvier South, Alberta, Canada
 Janvier Airport, airport in Janvier South
 Saint-Janvier-de-Joly, Quebec

Others
Janvier v. Sweeney, a 1919 decision by the English Court of Appeal dealing with liability for nervous shock caused by an intentional act